Faculty Higher Secondary School is a private school in Guwahati, Assam, India part of Osom Educational Trust. 

The school is affiliated with Central Board of Secondary Education since 1989. It has classes from LKG to XII. The Senior Secondary section has three streams – Arts, Science & Commerce. It is a Day school with limited Hostel facilities.

School Crest 
The crest of the school has been inspired by the Ahom Winged Lion, a symbol of the Ahom dynasty of Assam (1200-1826 AD). The concept of the Crest with slight modification from the winged lion of the Ahom Kings was given by Sri Nilpawan Barua, famous Artist of Assam’s creative art.

History 
Faculty Higher Secondary School was conceived as an idea by Mrs. Banti Bhuyan who felt the paucity of good schools in the private sector and from this conviction, the embryo of the school was born in 1981. Shri Pradip Kumar Bhuyan created a small Trust for the development of the school. The school started on 2 January 1982 in hired premises in Ambari. 
The school went through many critical situations - a few even threatened the closure of the school, but these were overcome by pragmatic measures and the founders gradually built up the infrastructure of the permanent complex in North Guwahati through a shared vision.

Location 
The school is located in North Guwahati, Assam, by the banks of Brahmaputra. It has an idyllic surrounding in 16 acres of greenery. Across the road of the School, the Indian Institute of Technology Guwahati with its sprawling complex is located, making the whole area an educational hub.
The school was shifted to its permanent complex in 1992 and the school today boasts of 100,000 sq. ft. of built-up indoor areas, - housing all indoor facilities including a well- developed biotech lab, conference facilities, libraries, activity areas, audio-visual rooms, language lab, digital teaching facilities, excellent computer facilities, etc. It has sprawling gardens and lawns, and open-air facilities like playgrounds,- volleyball, basketball, football, cricket, open-air stages, picnic areas etc, The school also boasts of an indoor cricket facility for cricket and first-class pitches for
practice and play.

Biennial Cultural Function 
The school hosts every two years a mega cultural function in its open-air stages. Students of the school participate in this function in some way or other. Nearly 1000 student take part in the actual function.
The list of programmes includes a drama, generally based on mythological or historical events, i.e rooted in Assamese culture and traditions.

Hostel Facilities 
The campus has a hostel for a limited number of students (35 boys, 25 girls) especially for neighboring states like Arunachal Pradesh, Nagaland, Manipur, Meghalaya, Sikkim, and Mizoram. The hostel is air-conditioned. The students enjoy all the advantages of the playing fields and facilities during school holidays.

References 
 http://facultyschool.org/pdf/prospectus/fhss_prospectus-2018.pdf

External links
 

Educational institutions established in 1980
Schools in Guwahati
1980 establishments in Assam